Gladiators – Heroes of the Colosseum is an international travelling exhibition from Italy on Roman gladiators. The exhibition portrays the Roman Empire and the gladiator games.

The exhibition has so far been exhibited at Aarhus, Denmark, at Ottawa, Canada, and at the Queensland Museum in Brisbane, Australia, and is currently being displayed in Jönköping, Sweden until August 2018, after which it will be held at the Musée de la Romanité in Nîmes, France. So far it has been seen by over 500,000 attendees. For every new exhibition, new segments are added.

References

Museum events
Traveling exhibits
Roman gladiators